"Stevie" (stylised as "stevie") is a song by English rock band Kasabian. It was released as the fourth single from their fifth studio album, 48:13, on 7 November 2014. The music video for the song was uploaded to YouTube on 13 October 2014. It is also featured as soundtrack on EA Sports game, FIFA 15. Also, according to Kasabian, the original inspiration for Stevie is actually Susie.

Music video
The official music video for the song, directed by Ninian Doff, was uploaded on 13 October 2014 to the band's Vevo channel on YouTube at a duration of four minutes and forty-seven seconds.

Track listing
Columbia – PARADISE94

Personnel
Kasabian
 Tom Meighan – lead vocals 
 Sergio Pizzorno – electric guitar, backing vocals, synthesizers, programming, production
 Chris Edwards – bass
 Ian Matthews – drums
Additional personnel
Gary Alesbrook – trumpet
Trevor Mires – trombone
Andrew Kinsman – saxophone
London Metropolitan Orchestra – strings

Chart performance

References

2014 singles
2014 songs
Kasabian songs
Music videos directed by Ninian Doff